Hypochnella is a fungal genus in the family Atheliaceae. The genus is monotypic, containing the single corticioid (crust-like) species Hypochnella violacea, found in Europe.

References

External links

Atheliales
Atheliales genera
Taxa named by Joseph Schröter
Taxa described in 1888